The Dockyard Museum is a museum located at Nelson's Dockyard in English Harbour on Antigua island, in Antigua and Barbuda. 

It was established in 1855 at the colonial British shipyard.

See also 
 
 List of museums in Antigua and Barbuda

References 

Museums in Antigua and Barbuda
Saint Paul Parish, Antigua and Barbuda
Museums established in 1855
1850s establishments in the Caribbean
1855 establishments in North America
1855 establishments in the British Empire